Billie Jean King was the defending champion but did not compete at this event in 1984.

Pam Shriver won in the final 7–6, 6–3 against Anne White.

Seeds
The top eight seeds receive a bye into the second round.

  Pam Shriver (Champion)
  Zina Garrison (second round)
  Kathy Rinaldi (third round)
  Pam Casale (second round)
  Alycia Moulton (third round)
  Kim Shaefer (third round)
  Rosalyn Fairbank (third round)
  JoAnne Russell (second round)
  Sharon Walsh (third round)
  Bettina Bunge (semifinals)
  Anne White (final)
 N/A
  Mary-Lou Piatek (second round)
  Wendy White (quarterfinals)

Qualifying

Draw

Finals

Top half

Section 1

Section 2

Bottom half

Section 3

Section 4

References
 1984 Edgbaston Cup Draws
 ITF Tournament Page
 ITF singles results page

Edgbaston Cup - Singles
Singles